Claudia Lonow (born January 26, 1963) is an American actress, comedian, television writer and producer. She is best known for her portrayal of Diana Fairgate on Knots Landing (1979-1984, 1993).

Early life and education 
Lonow was born Claudia Rapaport in New York City to mother JoAnne Astrow and father David Rapaport, a radio executive who was the general manager of the All-Disco format at New York radio station WKTU Disco 92. She has two younger half-brothers: Eric Rapaport, a doctor, and Michael Rapaport, a film and television actor. Her stepfather is comic Mark Lonow, who owned The Improv with Budd Friedman. She took his surname. Lonow is Jewish and grew up in a Jewish family.

Lonow graduated from The High School of Music and Art in New York City.

Career

Actor
Lonow is known for her role as Diana Fairgate on the CBS series Knots Landing, in which she appeared from 1979 to 1984 and again in 1993. She reprised her role in the 1997 reunion miniseries Knots Landing: Back to the Cul-de-Sac. She guest starred on Fantasy Island, The Love Boat and Hotel.

Writer and producer
Lonow's behind-the-scenes career took off with her creation, co-production and writing of Rude Awakening, a television series which aired on Showtime from 1998–2001 and starred actresses Sherilyn Fenn and Rain Pryor. Lonow also created, wrote and produced the comedy series Good Girls Don't.

Lonow held writing and consulting producer credits on the TV series Less Than Perfect. She also wrote and co-executive produced the FOX series The War at Home and CBS's Accidentally on Purpose.

In 2012, she created, wrote and produced the ABC sitcom How to Live with Your Parents (for the Rest of Your Life) starring Sarah Chalke, Brad Garrett, and Elizabeth Perkins.

Personal life 
Lonow has a daughter.

Filmography 
 1996: Don't Quit Your Day Job (Video Game) – Writer
 1997: The New Adventures of Robin Hood (TV Series) – Writer (1 episode) 
 1998-2001: Rude Awakening (TV Series) – Executive producer (47 episodes); Co-executive producer (8 episodes), Creator (55 episodes); Writer (13 episodes) 
 2003: Regular Joe (TV Series) – Creative consultant (1 episode) 
 2003-2006: Less than Perfect (TV Series) – Consulting producer (49 episodes); Writer (2 episodes); Consultant (12 episodes)  
 2004: Good Girls Don't... (TV Series) – Executive producer, Creator (8 episodes) 
 2006: Flirt (TV Movie) – Executive producer 
 2006-2007: The War at Home (TV Series) – Co-executive producer (32 episodes); Writer (3 episodes); Teleplay by (1 episode)  
 2008: Cashmere Mafia (TV Series) – Consulting producer (6 episodes); Writer (1 episode)
 2009: Surviving Suburbia (TV Series) – Writer (3 episodes)  
 2009-2010: Accidentally on Purpose (TV Series) – Executive producer (16 episodes); Creator (8 episodes); Writer (4 episodes) 
 2010: Iris Expanding (TV Movie) – Executive producer
 2011: Friends with Benefits (TV Series) – Co-executive producer (11 episodes); Writer (1 episode)
 2012: Work It (TV Series) – Co-executive producer (1 episode); Writer (2 episodes) 
 2012: Counter Culture (TV Movie) – Executive producer 
 2013: How to Live with Your Parents (For the Rest of Your Life) (For the Rest of Your Life) (TV Series) – Executive producer (5 episodes); Creator (13 episodes); Writer (3 episodes) 
 2013-2014: Sean Saves the World (TV Series) – Writer (2 episodes) 
 2015: Bummed (Short) – Co-writer, Director
 2016: Comedy Central Sit N Spin (TV Series) – Writer (1 episode)
 2016: Crowded (TV Series) – Consulting producer (12 episodes); Writer (1 episode)

Actor
 1979: The Mary Tyler Moore Hour (TV Series) – Mary Ellen in Mary's Goddaughter, Episode #1.6 (1979)
 1979-1984, 1993: Knots Landing (TV Series) – Diana Fairgate / Diana (81 episodes)
 1982: Drop-Out Father (TV Movie) – Peggy McCall
 1982: Fantasy Island (TV Series) – Taylor in Legends/The Perfect Gentleman (1982)
 1982: Wacko – Pam Graves
 1983: The Love Boat (TV Series) – Suzie Scott in The Zinging Valentine/The Very Temporary Secretary/Final Score (1983)
 1987: Hotel (TV Series) – Hayley Cole in Fast Forward (1987)
 1987, 1989: Duet (TV Series) – Ms. Taylor in I Never Played for My Father: Part 2 (1987); Carol in Too Many Cooks (1989)
 1990: Thanksgiving Day (TV Movie) – Toni
 1990: Eating – Party Guest
 1994: Beverly Hills, 90210 (TV Series) – Hairdresser in What I Did on My Summer Vacation and Other Stories (1994)
 1996: Don't Quit Your Day Job (Video Game) – Shirly Felcker
 1997: 7th Heaven (TV Series) – Waitress in America's Most Wanted (1997)
 1997: Knots Landing: Back to the Cul-de-Sac (TV Mini-Series) – Diana Fairgate
 2001: Rude Awakening (TV Series) – Linda in Altar Ego (2001)

Works and publications

References

External links 
 
 
 

American television actresses
Television producers from New York City
American women television producers
American television writers
Living people
Writers from New York City
American women television writers
Actresses from New York City
The High School of Music & Art alumni
1963 births
Screenwriters from New York (state)
20th-century American actresses
20th-century American screenwriters
20th-century American women writers
20th-century American Jews
21st-century American screenwriters
21st-century American women writers
21st-century American Jews
Jewish American actresses
Jewish American screenwriters